WCTF (1170 AM) is a radio station licensed to Family Radio and located in Vernon, Connecticut. The station operates during the daytime only with 1,000 watts of power, using a two-tower directional antenna system.

History
On May 24, 1979, the FCC granted a construction permit to Tolland County Broadcasting, Inc., for a new daytime-only radio station on 1170 kHz in Vernon. The firm's efforts were troubled by delays obtaining a site. Taking the call letters WRTT for "Radio Tri-Town", the station did not begin broadcasting until November 21, 1982, operating from studios in Rockville with programming of interest for listeners in and near Vernon. The outlet went silent in 1985 due to financial issues; the station was purchased by Family Radio in 1985 for $136,000, with the transaction finalized in January 1986. In 1998, the studios were moved from Rockville to the transmitter site on Penfield Drive in Ellington.

References

External links

Radio stations established in 1982
Family Radio stations
CTF
1982 establishments in Connecticut
CTF